Thomas Gloag (born 13 September 2001) is a British racing cyclist, who currently rides for UCI WorldTeam .

Career
At the 2022 Tour de l'Avenir Gloag was in a breakaway on stage 4 that made it to the finish line where he won the sprint against Adam Holm Jørgensen to take his second stage victory at Under-23 level. Whilst on his way up the podium to celebrate his win with Bernard Hinault he tripped and slipped down the stairs. He took lead of the race after his result, he would slip to second in the following stages then nineteenth overall before abandoning the race. It was announced on 7 August 2022 that Gloag would join  as a stagiaire for the rest of the 2022 season. On 29 August 2022  announced that Gloag would join their team from the 2023 season on a three-year contract.

Major results
Sources:

2019
 1st Trofeo Fundación
 1st Zumarraga
 Junior Tour of Wales
1st  Mountains classification
1st Stage 2
 3rd Overall Sint-Martinusprijs Kontich
1st Stage 1 (TTT)
 8th Kuurne–Brussels–Kuurne Juniors
2021
 3rd Overall Ronde de l'Isard
1st Stage 4
 4th Overall Giro Ciclistico d'Italia
 6th Liège–Bastogne–Liège Espoirs
2022
 1st Stage 4 Tour de l'Avenir
 3rd Flèche Ardennaise
2023
 6th Overall Volta a la Comunitat Valenciana
1st  Young rider classification

References

External links

2001 births
Living people
British male cyclists
Cyclists from Greater London